The Town of Ruby is located in northeast Chippewa County in the U.S. state of Wisconsin. The population was 494 at the 2010 census. The unincorporated communities of Arnold and Ruby are located in the town.

Geography
It occupies the northeast corner of Chippewa County and is bordered by Rusk County to the north and Taylor County to the east.

History
The area that would become the town of Ruby was first surveyed in 1852 by two crews working for the U.S. government. From September into October a crew marked all the section corners in the northern  of the township, walking through the woods and slogging through the swamps on foot, measuring with chain and compass. When done, the deputy surveyor filed this general description:
This Township contains, but little land fit for cultivation, considerable Tamarac swamp, and but little Grass land(?) in Hay meddow. The surface is level except in a few places, where it is uneven(?) not Hilley. None of it above 3rd rate. Timber Hemlock, Pine, Birch Sugar and Balsom. The Pine on and near Fisher and Jump River is of the best quallity and in Considerable quantity.

Fisher River Enters the Township in section 25 and keeps a westerly direction across the Township, leaving it on section 18. The stream has a rapid current and Rockey bed. Jump River Enter on sec 5 and leaves on section 6. Rapid Rocky Stream. Some good Pine on its Banks.

The town of Ruby was named for the only daughter of E. L. Hawn, who arrived in 1902 and founded the Ruby Lumber Company.

Demographics

As of the census of 2000, there were 446 people, 152 households, and 120 families residing in the town. The population density was 8.3 people per square mile (3.2/km2). There were 197 housing units at an average density of 3.7 per square mile (1.4/km2). The racial makeup of the town was 99.55% White, 0.22% Native American, 0.22% from other races. Hispanic or Latino of any race were 0.22% of the population.

There were 152 households, out of which 38.2% had children under the age of 18 living with them, 67.8% were married couples living together, 5.3% had a female householder with no husband present, and 20.4% were non-families. 16.4% of all households were made up of individuals, and 5.3% had someone living alone who was 65 years of age or older. The average household size was 2.93 and the average family size was 3.25.

The population was 33.4% under the age of 18, 7.6% from 18 to 24, 27.8% from 25 to 44, 20.9% from 45 to 64, and 10.3% who were 65 years of age or older. The median age was 36 years. For every 100 females, there were 105.5 males. For every 100 females age 18 and over, there were 114 males.

The median income for a household in the town was $30,208, and the median income for a family was $33,125. Males had a median income of $27,750 versus $22,813 for females. The per capita income for the town was $12,587. About 12.4% of families and 16.9% of the population were below the poverty line, including 22.8% of those under age 18 and 11.5% of those age 65 or over.

References

Towns in Chippewa County, Wisconsin
Eau Claire–Chippewa Falls metropolitan area
Towns in Wisconsin